Minyacris is a genus of spur-throated grasshoppers in the family Acrididae. There are two described species in Minyacris. Minyacris nana is found in southeastern Australia, and Minyacris occidentalis is found in western Australia.

Species
These two species belong to the genus Minyacris:
 Minyacris nana (Sjöstedt, 1921) (tiny grasshopper)
 Minyacris occidentalis Key, 1992

References

External links

 

Acrididae